Zborowice may refer to the following places in Poland:
Zborowice, Lower Silesian Voivodeship (south-west Poland)
Zborowice, Lesser Poland Voivodeship (south Poland)